The Lakes Flying Company was an early British aircraft manufacturer of seaplanes based at Windermere. In 1914 it was taken over by the Northern Aircraft Company Limited.

History
The first product of the Lakes Flying Company was the Lakes Water Bird, which first flew on 25 November 1911 but was destroyed in March 1912 when the Hangar collapsed in a gale. The Water Bird was the first successful British seaplane. It was followed by two further aircraft, the Water Hen and Sea Bird. The final design was the Hydro-monoplane. The seaplanes performed many pleasure flights from the Lake for the general public. In November 1914 the company was bought by the Northern Aircraft Company and the lakeside facility was expanded and pilot training (advertised as The Seaplane School) as well as pleasure flights were undertaken.

One of the pilots of the Northern Aircraft Company was John Lankester Parker, who became Chief Test Pilot for the Short Brothers company in Rochester, Kent and later Belfast, Northern Ireland.

Aircraft
 1911 Lakes Water Bird
 1912 Lakes Water Hen
 1912 Lakes Sea Bird
 1914 Lakes Hydro-monoplane

References

Notes

Bibliography

Defunct aircraft manufacturers of England
Companies based in Cumbria
1914 disestablishments in England
1911 establishments in England
British companies disestablished in 1914
British companies established in 1911